Richard Tydeman (born 26 May 1951) is an English retired footballer who played professionally for Charlton Athletic and Peterborough United but is best known for his time with Gillingham where, in two spells, he made over 370 Football League appearances.

Career
Tydeman came through the ranks with Gillingham and was playing for the reserves at the age of fifteen. He broke into the first team at eighteen and was a first choice in the Gills' midfield for the next seven years, although in 1971 he briefly contemplated quitting the game to become a teacher. He was named as the Kent side's Player of the Season for 1972–73.

In December 1976 Tydeman followed his former manager Andy Nelson to Charlton Athletic for a fee of £65,000, then a record fee received by Gillingham. He stayed with the Addicks for five years before returning to Gillingham as one of new manager Keith Peacock's first signings. After two seasons at Priestfield Stadium he moved to Peterborough United before seeing out his career with a number of Kent non-league teams.

After retirement he became a taxi driver. His son Sam was a trainee with Gillingham but failed to make the grade.

References

1951 births
Living people
Sportspeople from Chatham, Kent
Footballers from Kent
English footballers
Gillingham F.C. players
Charlton Athletic F.C. players
Peterborough United F.C. players
Chatham Town F.C. players
Dover Athletic F.C. players
Bromley F.C. players
Canterbury City F.C. players
Association football midfielders
English Football League players